Jigsaw is a 1989 thriller film starring Rebecca Gibney.

Plot
Virginia York's husband is killed on the first day of their honeymoon and she is the prime suspect.

Cast
Rebecca Gibney as Virginia York
Dominic Sweeney as Detective Constable Broulle
Gary Day as Gordon Carroll
Terence Donovan as Jack McClusky
Michael Coard as Aaron York
James Wright as Ray Carpenter
David Bradshaw as Alex York
John Flaus as Oliver
Brenda Addie as Jean
Anthony Fletcher as Tony
Nick Lathouris as Ted Minter

References

External links

Jigsaw at Screen Australia
Jigsaw at TCMDB

Australian thriller films
1989 films
1989 thriller films
1980s English-language films
1980s Australian films